Incagonum is a genus of ground beetles in the family Carabidae. There are more than 20 described species in Incagonum, found in South America.

Species
These 25 species belong to the genus Incagonum:

 Incagonum aeneum (Reiche, 1843)  (Colombia, Ecuador, and Peru)
 Incagonum ambiguum (Solier, 1849)  (Chile)
 Incagonum andicola (Bates, 1891)  (Ecuador and Peru)
 Incagonum angulatum (Chaudoir, 1854)  (Brazil)
 Incagonum bonariense (Gemminger & Harold, 1868)  (Argentina)
 Incagonum brasiliense (Dejean, 1828)  (Brazil)
 Incagonum chilense (Dejean, 1831)  (Chile)
 Incagonum circumdatum (Erichson, 1834)  (Chile)
 Incagonum cordicolle (Solier, 1849)  (Chile)
 Incagonum dejeani (Solier, 1849)  (Chile)
 Incagonum discosulcatum (Dejean, 1828)  (Argentina)
 Incagonum fuscoaeneum (Gemminger & Harold, 1868)  (Argentina)
 Incagonum gayi (Solier, 1849)  (Chile)
 Incagonum hiekei Allegro; Giachino & Moret, 2016  (Peru)
 Incagonum inca (Moret, 1994)  (Peru)
 Incagonum laevicolle (Solier, 1849)  (Chile)
 Incagonum lineatopunctatum (Dejean, 1831)  (Argentina)
 Incagonum lucidum Allegro; Giachino & Moret, 2016  (Peru)
 Incagonum mateui (Moret, 1994)  (Peru)
 Incagonum melas (Solier, 1849)  (Argentina and Chile)
 Incagonum opacum Allegro; Giachino & Moret, 2016  (Peru)
 Incagonum pedestre (Putzeys, 1878)  (Colombia)
 Incagonum peruvianum Allegro; Giachino & Moret, 2016  (Peru)
 Incagonum quadricolle (Dejean, 1828)  (Argentina)
 Incagonum semistriatum (Fairmaire, 1884)  (Argentina)

References

Platyninae